Opus Magnum is a puzzle-based programming game developed by Zachtronics. It was released for Microsoft Windows, Linux and macOS in December 2017, following about two months of early access.  In the game, the player must assemble a series of machines using various tools and program them to complete alchemy-related tasks. The player can advance with any working solution to each problem, but is challenged through leaderboards to produce a machine that does the task in the shortest time, with the lowest cost of materials, and/or the smallest occupied area. Opus Magnum is based on The Codex of Alchemical Engineering, one of the earliest Flash games made by Zach Barth prior to establishing Zachtronics.

Gameplay
Opus Magnum has the player take the role of an alchemist to create required products by manipulating atoms of base alchemy elements (the classic elements as well as the metals of antiquity) through a device they construct within a transmutation engine. The engine is represented as a hex grid which the player arranges various manipulation tools and transmutation spaces on. Manipulators are mechanical arms that rotate around a pivot point, pick up and drop atoms, and rotate structures it currently has picked up, with optional variants that can extend and retract the arm, and/or travel along a track path. Transmutation spaces can create a bond, destroy a bond, transform a basic element into "salt", or upgrade base metals into higher ones using quicksilver. Manipulation parts have a cost to them, though the player is not limited to a total number of manipulation elements, cost, or space the device takes up in crafting their solution.

After placing manipulators, the player must then provide each manipulator a set of commands that take atoms from input spaces and drop the proper completed material into the target output space; an early puzzle demonstrates how one turns lead into gold. Manipulators can have individual programs, and each run simultaneously once the machine is started. The goal for most puzzles is to deliver a fixed number of target output products, thus testing the machine's operation over several cycles. Should the device encounter a physically impossible situation (collision between atoms, collision of an atom and an arm base or two arms trying to move an atom in two different directions at the same time), the device will stop and require the player to readjust the machine.

Once a player has successfully demonstrated a device that completes the goals of the puzzle, they are ranked with all other players based on three factors: the speed of the device, the cost of the device, and the total area that the device takes. Player can then attempt alternate solutions that improve in any of these areas. Completed devices can be exported into an animated GIF to be shared on social media.

The game is structured through several chapters, providing the player with multiple puzzles they can work on and come back to as needed, though all puzzles within a chapter must be completed to progress to the next. The game includes Steam Workshop support to allow users to supply their own puzzles, with the game only accepting puzzles that the user has shown possible to complete on their own.

Development

Zach Barth is the primary developer behind Zachtronics and has created a number of puzzle-driven programming games. Opus Magnum is a refined version of Barth's first game, The Codex of Alchemical Engineering, which was a 2008 browser game programmed in Adobe Flash. Codex was popular enough for Barth to create an expansion, also written in Flash, called Magnum Opus Challenge. While Barth led the programming effort, Matthew Burns was the writer for the game's dialog and composed its music. For Opus Magnum they wanted to create a story and setting to help drive players to finish puzzles, but wanted to avoid the steampunk nature that seemed to be a clear fit for the game's mechanics.

One driver in developing Opus Magnum was to make sure players could make animated GIF images of their solutions to share. Barth had included the ability for players to record their solution for Infinifactory, a three-dimensional block-based game, but these images required viewers to have some spatial concept of how the solution was laid out. One user had produced a looping GIF of one of their factory solutions, which Barth and his team found strangely satisfying. This led Barth to design Opus Magnum to be inherently GIF-able with seamlessly repeating loops that looked appealing and required little other context for viewers to understand.

As with several of Barth's recent titles, he opted to release a near-completed version of the game on early access via Steam prior to issuing a full release. The game was first put onto early access on October 19, 2017. It was fully released on December 8, 2017. While previous games from the developer were sold on both Steam and GOG.com, the latter initially declined to distribute Opus Magnum due to its resemblance to a mobile game. While GOG representatives initially claimed that the game had failed the site's internal curation system, and that its user base would not want to purchase it, on January 31, 2018, the site reversed its position after a fan outcry, and began offering it for sale, stating that their initial perception of the game's quality and community demand had been incorrect.

Reception 

Opus Magnum received generally favorable reviews according to review aggregator Metacritic.

The game was nominated for "Best Puzzle Game" in IGN's Best of 2017 Awards, and for "Best Indie Game" and "Best PC Game" at the 2018 Golden Joystick Awards, and won the award for "Excellence in Design" at the Independent Games Festival Awards, whereas its other nomination was for the Seumas McNally Grand Prize.

References

External links
 

2017 video games
Early access video games
Independent Games Festival winners
Indie video games
Linux games
MacOS games
Programming games
Puzzle video games
Single-player video games
Video games about alchemy
Video games developed in the United States
Windows games
Zachtronics games